The Dam (in French:Le barrage) is a painting by Luxembourg artist Dominique Lang from 1913.

Description 
The 80.5 × 67 cm. picture is part of the collection of the National Museum of History and Art in Luxembourg.

Analysis
Dominique Lang was the only representative of Luxembourg in the first exhibition of the Impressionists in Paris.

After completing his education at the Academy of Fine Arts in Antwerp in 1900, he began to paint in a symbolist style. After 1912–1913, he began using more refined technique and painted many landscapes in rural areas, where he lived. The Dam was  shown at the Salon des Indépendants, 1914, where he received good feedback on the work and creativity. He managed to recreate the refraction of sunlight into the colors of the rainbow. His sense of nature and authenticity continued the tradition of Claude Monet and Pierre-Auguste Renoir. His landscapes evoke the world without industrialization.

References 

1913 paintings
Luxembourgian culture
Impressionist paintings
Symbolist paintings
Water in art